Thomas George Prince MM SSM (October 25, 1915 – November 25, 1977) was an Indigenous Canadian war hero and the most decorated soldier in the First Special Service Force or Devil's Brigade, an elite American-Canadian commando unit, during World War II. He was Canada's most decorated First Nations soldier, serving in World War II and the Korean War.  Prince's military deeds as a scout and as a forward combatant were unique and of major strategic importance.

Tommy Prince was descended from First Nations chiefs. Prince's grandfather had negotiated treaty rights in Manitoba with representatives of The Crown. Prince himself would also represent First Nations concerns in Ottawa as Chairman of the Manitoba Indian Association (currently Assembly of Manitoba Chiefs) and the First Nations delegation. He advocated for the abolition of the governing Indian Act in Canada and proposed respect for the traditional Crown treaties as the basis of First Nations rights. Prince's position, although considered radical at the time, has been vindicated in subsequent decades by Supreme Court of Canada rulings in support of the Crown treaties and is now the basis of government policy.

Early life
Born in Petersfield, Manitoba, he was one of 11 children of Henry and Arabella Prince of the Peguis First Nation (Brokenhead Ojibway Nation) near Scanterbury, Manitoba. He was the great-grandson of the Indigenous Chief, Peguis,  who had led his nation from Sault Ste. Marie, currently in Ontario, to the southern end of Lake Winnipeg in the late 1790s, keeping their French name, the Saulteaux. Chief Peguis, who lived until 1864, gave his name to his people, but created the Anglicized name "Prince" for his sons and successors. Tommy Prince was the grandson of Chief Henry Prince, also known as Mis-koo-kenew or Red Eagle, a son of Chief Peguis, who was an original signatory and a principal negotiator of First Nations Treaty 1 at Lower Fort Garry, Manitoba on behalf of the Peguis or Saulteaux tribe on 3 August 1871. The treaty as negotiated reserved hunting and fishing rights for the indigenous tribes of Manitoba, as well as land rights. Chief Henry Prince was also an original signatory to Treaty 2 on 23 August 1875, which reaffirmed the promises contained in Treaty 1. Tommy Prince's father Henry Prince was also a chief of the Saulteaux nation.

Tommy Prince's family members had a strong military tradition, and had served in the Canadian armed forces in support of the Crown during the 1870 Red River Rebellion. Chief William Prince (a first cousin of Tommy Prince's father) had led the Nile Expedition Voyageurs in the relief of General Gordon at the Siege of Khartoum in 1885. During WWI Prince's family members had served in France. 

Growing up, Prince became a superb marksman with exceptional tracking and stealth skills learned from countless days spent hunting in the wilderness around his Indigenous reserve. Prince's father would teach him marksmanship and he developed the skill to shoot five bullets through a target the size of a playing card at 100 metres. He attended Elkhorn Residential School, completing grade eight and proceeding to secondary school. He joined the student Royal Canadian Army Cadets and later stated, "As soon as I put my uniform on, I felt like a better man. I even tried to wear it to class." He continued with the Army Cadets throughout his teenage years. Prince had aspirations to become a lawyer, but had to leave high school at age 16 due to circumstances of the time, dire family finances during the Great Depression. He was employed at a variety of manual-labour positions but primarily as a tree feller.

World War II

First Special Service Force creation
At the start of World War II in September 1939 Prince volunteered to fight with the Canadian Army, although First Nations members were not subject to any conscription for national defence and were not required to join the armed forces. He easily met the requirements for recruitment, but was turned down several times before he was finally accepted on 3 June 1940, at a time when the war had reached a crisis for British and Canadian forces with defeat in the Fall of France. He was originally a member of the Royal Canadian Engineers, trained as a "sapper" or member of a combat engineering platoon. He was promoted to lance corporal in February 1941. Prince eventually became bored with the routine duties spent mostly behind a desk or a lathe, and joined organized Canadian Army sports activities such as running and boxing. Later in 1942 he learned of the creation of a new unit which interested him, and he volunteered for duty with a parachute unit designated the 2nd Canadian Parachute Battalion. This designation was used to disguise the true reason for the recruitment of parachute volunteers in the UK at that time: the United States and Canada had begun the formation of a special force to conduct sabotage and raids against targets in German-occupied Norway. Men were recruited in Canada and in the overseas Canadian Army in Britain for this unit secretly named the First Special Service Force. The Canadians involved with this training continued to be listed on the rosters of their prior units. Although later given an official title of the 2nd Canadian Parachute Battalion for administrative purposes, no such unit actually existed. Prince then reported to the UK's parachute school at RAF Ringway, near Manchester.

In September 1942 he returned to Canada where his enlistment was registered as the 1st Canadian Parachute Battalion (1CPB), and was promoted to sergeant. He then formally but unofficially volunteered for the still confidential and unknown 1st Canadian Special Service Battalion and proceeded to Fort Benning, Georgia, where they were forming. The Canadians were well below strength due to injuries in training and washouts of substandard recruits. They agreed to bolster the 1st Special Service Force (later known as the "Devil's Brigade") commando unit by allowing men to volunteer, and were transported to Helena, Montana where the Americans in the Force were training. Due to security and secrecy concerns, the Americans and Canadians were transported to Montana by trains with the windows blacked out, so that no one would know where they were headed. The modern American and Canadian special operations forces trace their heritage to this unit. The Force initially consisted of 1,800 men, 900 Americans and 900 Canadians, and one-half of the officers were Canadian and the Brigade second-in-command was a Canadian. As casualties reduced the size of the Force during combat, the Canadian contingent could not be replaced due to manpower restrictions in the Canadian Army, and eventually about two-thirds of the brigade were American and one-third Canadian. 

The Brigade commander was Robert T. Frederick, who had masterminded the creation of the unit. Frederick would later be hailed by Winston Churchill as "the greatest fighting General of all time". American equipment, arms, and uniforms were used and provided by the U.S. government with a Canadian financial contribution. Prince and the other men of this unit were originally chosen for their rugged outdoor backgrounds and received rigorous training, often under live fire. Only single men were chosen for the Force, married men were not accepted. All members of this elite commando force received intensive instruction in stealth tactics, hand-to-hand combat, the use of explosives for demolition, amphibious warfare, rock climbing and mountain fighting and as ski troops. They were trained meticulously in the operation and assembly of German weapons, in the event that it became necessary to use German weapons on the battlefield during combat. This training in German weapons would later prove to be of critical importance in some of the Force's battles. Prince became a "Reconnaissance Sergeant"—or, in the Force table of organization, a "Scout"—responsible for moving into forward positions and reporting on the movements of the enemy.

Warrior Traditions
Prince's Ojibwe First Nations warrior traditions would be assimilated into his combat skills. The Ojibwe/Algonkian warrior traditions emphasized the skills of stealth and invisibility in their tactical methods. Even in large scale battles, once the action commenced the fighting was undertaken on a single combat basis by individual warriors. The causes and resolutions of the battle were determined by individual grievances, and loss of life was deliberately circumscribed to resolve the issues with a minimum of casualties.

Italy deployment
The Norwegian operations were cancelled due to changes in Allied strategy. Following reassignment, the 1st Special Service Force was initially deployed in the Aleutians for possible actions against Japanese forces, but no battlefield situations materialized. The unique capabilities of the Force in mountain warfare were recognized by Allied commanders in the Italian campaign, and the Force then moved to Italy in November 1943. They would take part in the stalled Allied offensive against the Bernhard or Winter Line, which had effectively obstructed the Allied push towards Rome. In December and January, the 1st Special Service Force would be assigned to assault enemy positions which were regarded as impregnable, Monte la Difensa, Hill 720, Monte Majo and Monte Vischiataro, assignments which large assaulting formations of Allied soldiers had failed to attain, and had sustained enormous and sometimes catastrophic casualties in the attempts.

During the Force's initial Italian assignment to a reserve position near Monte Cassino, Tommy Prince first discovered and developed his capabilities of entering enemy locations at night without making any sound and without the enemy being aware of his presence. Prince's ability to move in complete silence wearing traditional moccasins into situations where the enemy could be threatened became known to senior officers such as Lt. Col. Tom Gilday, who commanded Prince's battalion. Gilday established a close working relationship with Prince and would assign him to special tasks requiring his unusual abilities.

Monte Majo
Monte Majo and Monte la Difensa were the critical twin mountain peaks which anchored the German defensive lines in Italy. The 1st Special Service Force managed to succeed in the Battle of Monte La Difensa on 3 to 9 December 1943 by scaling a steep cliff at night and attacking the German forces on the summit. The next principal objective planned for early January 1944 was the taking of Monte Majo, which was assigned to the Canadian contingent of the Devil's Brigade, and was an almost insurmountable problem. German artillery and machine-gun emplacements had been arranged in layers on the steep slopes. An attack on any one of them would alert the other defenses and also the main German positions on the summit. Any assaulting force would be met with withering fire. Earlier Allied attempts to take the mountain had met with failure and disastrous casualties.  

Lt. Col. Gilday, desperate to devise some strategy for the assault, assigned Tommy Prince to lead a patrol and move at night in an attempt to create a pathway for an assault on Monte Majo by eliminating the enemy gun emplacements on the lower and middle slopes of Monte Majo blocking the intended route. This would require Prince to execute his orders without making any sound or arousing the other German positions. If Prince's mission succeeded, it would allow an assault by the Force to follow immediately and climb up the steep mountain side. The offensive was planned for 8 January 1944. 

The commanding officer for the assault on Monte Majo, Cpt. Taylor Radcliffe, remarked that Tommy Prince "moved just like a shadow" as he led his patrol away from the forward outpost into the night. Under cover of darkness, Prince led his patrol partway up the lower slopes to a position where he left his men behind as a supporting group, should they be needed to provide covering fire. Prince then single-handedly approached and entered the successive German gun emplacements one after another, commencing with the gun pits on the lower slopes and then proceeding with the higher emplacements on the middle slopes. He successfully dispatched all of the gunners and soldiers in the artillery and machine gun bunkers with complete silence and without eliciting any enemy alarms or defensive fire. Prince then returned with his patrol to Cpt. Radcliffe's forward post before dawn and reported that his mission was accomplished. All of the German gun pits located on the intended route of the Force's assault at the base and the middle of Monte Majo had been neutralized, with only the German positions on the summit remaining to defend the mountain. When the Force commenced their movement up the slopes of Monte Majo, they passed by the now silent German machine gun and artillery bunkers, and Radcliffe became aware that Prince had done "a beautiful job". Radcliffe never learned the exact details of how Prince had managed to accomplish this stunning result, beyond the fact that Prince had entered the gun emplacements and had then eliminated the gun platoons. Radcliffe's company leading the attack was able to ascend to the summit of Monte Majo without firing a single bullet. Prince's silent feat of arms enabled the daring assault by the Brigade on Monte Majo to proceed, the enemy taken by complete surprise. 

Once in control of the summit, the Force made use of captured German heavy machine guns which had been abandoned during the enemy retreat to repel a long series of fierce German counter-attacks over a period of several days. The distinctive sound of the German heavy guns were identified by the German counter-assault soldiers, who would shout out in confusion to the Force soldiers holding the summit, in German, "Stop shooting at us! We are Germans!" Prince would also be involved in these later actions to defend the summit against counter-attack. Following the taking of Monte Majo, the 1st Special Service Force had been reduced from 1,800 men at the start of the winter campaign to only 400 as a result of casualties.

The Canadian contingent of the 1st Special Service Force was awarded the Battle Honour "Mount Majo" for this action by both the U.S. and Canadian governments. Tommy Prince did not receive any individual award or medal for his unparalleled and essential contribution to the successful outcome. Prince's special skills and acts of stealth at Monte Majo would have been regarded as classified information related to a secret mission. The nature of Prince's assignment at Monte Majo could not have been described in a medal nomination or citation without compromising the security of future operations. In recent years, special operations soldiers are often awarded high decorations in secret, but are not awarded the highest decorations to avoid public exposure. The 1st Special Service Force, a unit in which heroic acts were commonplace, earned many unit awards which were shared by the entire Brigade, but comparatively infrequently awarded individual medals to its men. Similar achievements to Prince's in combat would typically be awarded a Distinguished Conduct Medal or the Victoria Cross or the Medal of Honor in the Allied forces in general. However, Prince's accomplishments at Monte Majo were of singular status which surpassed the range of any existing medal.

In November, 2019, a Bravery In Arms documentary  was produced of the First Special Service Force assault on Monte Majo. In the documentary, Prince's accomplishment was described while showing the actual location of the battle.

Anzio
After breaking through the German Bernhard Line, the 1st Special Service Force was then moved to Anzio, where a U.S. and Allied landing had been contained and was heavily under attack. The 1st Special Service Force, now comprising about 1,200 men, was tasked with holding several miles of perimeter against a full German division. On 5 February 1944, near Littoria, Prince was sent forward by Lt. Col. Gilday to report the location of several German assembly points, including artillery positions. When Prince failed to return the following day, Gilday feared that he had been killed or captured by the Germans. However, Prince suddenly emerged from the darkness into Gilday's post two nights later and reported to Gilday how he had found a deserted farm house close to major German gun positions. With Prince still observing from inside the farmhouse, German patrols had then arrived and  occupied the house. Prince had managed to elude the Germans searching the house without being discovered and had then hid in the attic for another day until the Germans left. The following night after this report, Prince was sent back by Lt. Col. Gilday to the same farmhouse bearing thousands of feet of communications wire. The next day, an artillery duel developed as the Allies attempted to knock out the guns reported by Prince, and one of these rounds cut the telephone wire. Prince discovered some farmer's clothes in a closet in the house, found some tools in the farm shed, and walked out dressed as a farmer weeding the crops. Locating the damaged wires, he rejoined them while pretending to tie his shoelaces. He made a show of shaking his fist at the nearby Germans, then again toward the Allied lines. Returning to his lookout spot he continued his reports, and over the next 24 hours four German batteries were knocked out of action. In all he spent three days behind enemy lines. When Prince returned to the Force positions and made his report, Lt. Col. Gilday pointed out to Prince that if he had been apprehended by the Germans while in the peasant clothes, he would have been executed as a spy. For this action he was awarded the Military Medal, his citation reading (in part) "Sergeant Prince's courage and utter disregard for personal safety were an inspiration to his fellows and a marked credit to his unit." Gilday's decision to recommend Prince for this medal immediately launched the reputation of Tommy Prince among the soldiers in the 1st Special Service Force as well as in other Allied units.

During the Anzio campaign, Prince would change his boots and don moccasins which he carried in his backpack whenever requiring silent movement. He would reportedly sneak past German security guards at night and enter enemy sleeping locations, leaving messages or warnings, stealing boots, and sometimes using his knife to dispatch an enemy soldier. These psychological warfare attacks earned the nickname of "geist" ("ghost" in English) or "Teufel" ("demon" or "evil spirit" in English) from the German soldiers.

Prince would also engage in a regular sniping schedule at Anzio, under his own initiative. He would venture out at night into no-man's land between the opposing armies, choose a hidden vantage point, and target any German who wandered within his sights. Before long, the German division opposing the 1st Special Service Force had retreated nearly two and a half miles away from direct contact, apparently shaken by the night activity of the Devil's Brigade.

France
After being the vanguard of the US forces liberating Rome on 4 June 1944, the SSF was moved to southern France as part of Operation Dragoon. First they would assault the Hyères Islands before going ashore at Sylvabelle on the French Riviera. There the force was ordered, as part of the 1st Airborne Task Force, to push eastward toward the Franco-Italian border. 

On 1 September Prince and a private were sent forward through the German lines to scout the enemy positions near L'Escarène and came across an encampment area of an enemy reserve battalion. Prince conducted a detailed observation of this German battalion at close quarters using natural foliage as a cover. He avoided being detected by the enemy. 

On the way back to report this discovery, Prince and the private came upon a battle between some German platoons and a squad of French partisans. Prince, an expert sniper, and the private started sniping the Germans from behind, killing about 12 of them, and the startled Germans eventually withdrew. Prince made contact with the French leader, who asked Prince where the rest of his company was located. When Prince pointed to the private and said "Here," the French commander exclaimed that he thought that there had been about 50 men involved in his relief. The French commander recommended Prince for the Croix de Guerre, but the courier was killed en route and the message never reached the French Commander-in-Chief, Charles de Gaulle.

Prince continued on and penetrated the German lines to rejoin the Force positions. He then led it back to the encampment of the German reserve forces and, together with the French squad of resistance fighters which Prince had rescued, joined in the battle. As a result, the entire German battalion of about 1000 men was killed or captured. From start to end Prince had been without food, water or sleep for 72 hours and had walked over 70 km across rugged, mountainous terrain. Afterwards he was recommended for the American Silver Star, his citation reading:

WWII Awards
After it was determined that both US and Canadian personnel would be better suited if they were dispersed to units in their own forces, the 1st Special Service Force was disbanded in December 1944. After returning to the UK, Prince was summoned to Buckingham Palace on 12 February 1945, where King George VI presented him with his Military Medal. When King George VI made his medal presentations, they would consist of a smile and a handshake, as they did for the other recipients on this occasion. However, when the King came to Tommy Prince, he stopped and discussed with Prince his various wartime exploits with the Force for several minutes, and also asked Prince about current conditions on the Brokenhead Reserve. Prince would later receive his Silver Star from US Brigadier-General E.F. Koenig (on behalf of the American President) on 24 April 1945; he was one of 59 Canadians to receive this award during the war, and one of only three to receive both the Silver Star and Military Medal. 

In addition to the two Decorations, Prince was Mentioned in Dispatches on several occasions. He received six service medals for his service in the Italian and North West Europe theatres of war, The 1939-1945 Star, The Italy Star, The France and Germany Star, The Defence Medal, The Canadian Volunteer Service Medal with Overseas Clasp, and The War Medal 1939-1945. As a member of the 1st Special Service Force, he received the Battle Honour "Mount Majo" for that extraordinary action, although he received no individual award for his secret mission to neutralize the German defences in the battle. The First Special Service Force as a unit  was awarded the French Croix de Guerre with Silver-Gilt Star, as well as the Presidential Unit Citation for extraordinary heroism. 

Prince was reportedly recommended for the French Croix de Guerre for his actions in rescuing a French military unit from German attack in September, 1944, but the courier carrying the information was killed before reaching General de Gaulle. However, in 2002 the Government of France issued an official certificate acknowledging the bravery and contributions of Tommy Prince to the French people and to their freedom from German occupation during WWII, which the French Ambassador to Canada presented to the Prince family. In 2006, the Canadian members of the 1st Special Service Force were each awarded the U.S. Army Combat Infantryman Badge in honour of their service in combat roles in WWII. On 3 February 2015, the U.S. Congress Congressional Gold Medal was awarded to the First Special Service Force as a unit.

The war in Europe ended while Prince was in England.

Post World War II

Business
Prince was honourably discharged on June 15, 1945, and returned to his home on the Brokenhead Reserve, working in a pulpwood camp. At this time, Prince's father died, and Prince divorced his first wife. In 1946, a woman attacked him at a dance and cut his cheek with a beer bottle, requiring 64 stitches. After this incident he left the reserve and moved to Winnipeg, although he retained his status as a "Treaty Indian" and did not become a member of Canadian general society.

No longer residing on the reserve, he was then eligible to apply for and receive some start-up business funding from the Department of Veteran's Affairs. Prince began a small but relatively prosperous cleaning service.

Parliamentary Committees and the Indian Act
In 1946 he was elected Vice-President of the Manitoba Indian Association (currently Assembly of Manitoba Chiefs). Prince was then appointed Chairman of the national delegation representing First Nations of Canada at the 1946 joint Senate and House of Commons Parliamentary Committees in Ottawa which were set up to review the Indian Act and to suggest ways to improve the conditions for Native peoples. He traveled across the country and consulted with Canadian First Nations organizations to lobby Ottawa for changes to the Indian Act. The Indian Act had imposed a paternalistic system on the First Nations, regarding them as "wards of the government". 

Prince advocated for the abolition of the Indian Act. The Act had made the First Nations essentially dependent upon the government to manage their lands and resources, and in the process had removed First Nations rights of access to capital markets, investment possibilities, and property ownership outside the reserves. Prince insisted that the traditional Crown treaties with the First Nations should be honoured and respected, and that the Crown treaties should form the basis of a new system for First Nations peoples. Tommy Prince's grandfather Chief Henry Prince had been a principal negotiator and signatory of Treaty 1 and Treaty 2 in Manitoba. The treaty rights had been absorbed into the Indian Act and were administered by a federal government department, the Department of Indian Affairs, on behalf of the First Nations, often with poor results. The leases and development of First Nations mineral resources were awarded to private companies owned by non-First Nations venture capitalists outside the reserves.

While Prince succeeded in obtaining several revisions to the Indian Act, removing some of the more offensive and outdated provisions of the Act, little fundamental restructuring followed immediately from the 1946 deliberations.  It would not be until 1959 that First Nations members obtained the right to vote in Canadian elections without any conditions by an amendment passed by the Canadian Parliament, a revision made with a different political party in power in Ottawa. Beginning in 1960, First Nations men and women could vote no matter where they lived, without having to renounce their Indian status to vote.

In the Parliamentary deliberations with respect to the Indian Act and possible amendments, Prince made a positive and powerful impression during the committee meetings, his arguments cogent and well-organized. Government officials considered offering him a position with the Department of Indian Affairs. However, Prince's opposition to the Indian Act was in conflict with government policy, and in the end, no job offer eventuated. In later decades, the Canadian government would come to accept a policy of eventually phasing out the Indian Act, while at the same time affirming the traditional First Nations treaty rights as supported by Supreme Court of Canada rulings. These later developments would constitute belated vindication of Prince's position on the issues.

Frustrated with the red tape of Ottawa, he returned to Winnipeg to discover that his cleaning business had folded in his absence because the friends Prince had entrusted to operate it had crashed the truck and sold the parts as scrap metal and had also sold the supplies and equipment, pocketing the money. Prince worked in lumber camps and a concrete factory to make ends meet.

He also continued to work on occasion with the Manitoba Indian Association and when a tribe in northern Manitoba was in trouble for violating provincial hunting regulations, Prince successfully interceded for them in representations to the Manitoba government.

Korean War

Night Assaults
In August 1950 Prince returned to the Canadian Army to fight with the United Nations troops in the Korean War. "I owed something to my friends who died" in WWII, he stated. Re-instated to his previous rank of sergeant, Prince was now a member of the 2nd Battalion Princess Patricia's Canadian Light Infantry (2 PPCLI), the first Canadian battalion to be assigned active duty in the war zone.

In February 1951 the Patricia's joined the 27th British Commonwealth Brigade on the battlefield. Prince was sergeant and second in command of his rifle platoon, and he soon resumed his special form of stealth missions. Shortly after his arrival in Korea he selected, trained and led an eight-man night "snatch patrol" into an enemy encampment under cover of darkness and with silent movements. The successful mission returned with two captured heavy machine guns taken from a position which had been heavily defended by Chinese soldiers. After seizing the guns, Prince and his men returned to the Canadian lines without alerting or arousing the enemy. The stealth tactics devised by Prince and executed by his special team resulted in the complete elimination of a strong Chinese defensive position in total silence, without firing any shots, while Prince and his force sustained no casualties. Prince went on to lead his special force on several more successful nocturnal demoralization raids against Chinese forces, again with the complete neutralization of enemy positions accomplished without the loss of any casualties by Prince's assaulting force. In 2022, a 2 PPCLI Korean War veteran credited Tommy Prince with saving his life due to the special training which Prince had given him.

However, while his company commanding officer was aware of Prince's renown as a nocturnal operative, the company CO was unfamiliar with and professed shock by Prince's bold methods of operation. Eventually the CO began to assign Prince to lead fewer patrols because he objected that they contained too many risks which could threaten the lives of the soldiers. However, the soldiers of the platoon were impressed with Prince's battlefield skills and were supportive of Prince in this disagreement. One military historian later concluded that there existed some jealousy between the officers and Prince because the men of the company respected Prince's fighting ability and his reputation. Prince's company commanding officer refused to nominate him for any awards or medals for masterminding and leading the extraordinary and successful night raids on Chinese positions. Prince prepared his own report of the dispute and submitted it to Lt. Col. James Stone, the battalion commander. Stone was a veteran of the WWII Italian campaign, where he had won fame with creative offensive tactics, sometimes receiving objections from his superior commanding generals.

Battle of Kapyong

Tommy Prince held a prominent role with the 2 PPCLI when it became the first Canadian unit awarded the United States Presidential Unit Citation for distinguished service in the Battle of Kapyong on 24-25 April, 1951. The battalion defended an important strategic position on Hill 677 despite heavy assault from Chinese forces. The Kapyong Valley provided a potential route for the enemy to encircle the U.S. forces in Korea. The Canadian 2 PPCLI, consisting of about 700 infantrymen and several machine guns, was opposed in the Kapyong River valley by a full Chinese division of 20,000 soldiers. Supporting UN forces initially consisted of a Royal  Australian Regiment infantry battalion, fifteen Sherman tanks from an American tank regiment, and two companies of U.S. artillery. However, the Australians were hurriedly withdrawn from the Kapyong battlefield after a fierce firefight with the attacking Chinese, who chased the Australians in hot pursuit. The American tanks came under heavy assault and retreated from the battlefield. Some of the American tanks fired upon the Canadians, wounding one man, before retreating from the battlefield. The two American artillery companies simply fled on foot without firing a single round, abandoning their big guns and mortars, equipment and 50 trucks loaded with ammunition to the enemy. The U.S. artillery companies hiked about ten miles to the east, apparently convinced that a major Chinese breakthrough was imminent at Kapyong.  Neither the Australians nor the Americans notified the Canadian forces of their sudden retreat, which left the Canadians encircled and alone in a two-day siege to hold the key position. 

Brigadier Burke, who commanded the 27th British Commonwealth Brigade, personally flew over the Canadian soldiers and shouted at them through a loudspeaker that they were now cut off and would receive no support. This action angered and unsettled the Canadian soldiers, who jeered Brigadier Burke as he flew away. Tommy Prince was credited with steadying and motivating many of the nervous young Canadians who voiced a desire to run in the face of overwhelming odds of about 30 to 1. The Canadian battalion commander Lt. Col. James Stone ordered his men to fight in a last stand with the words, "No retreat, no surrender." 

The fighting was fierce and often hand-to-hand with bayonets, the Chinese gaining access to the summit of Hill 677 through the numerous ravines along the sides of the 2,000 ft. hill. Thousands of Chinese soldiers swarmed the Canadian positions, with the Canadians running low on ammunition. The Canadian unit would twice take shelter in their shallow trenches scraped from the rocky ground and call in supporting long-distance artillery fire from 4.5 miles away targeted directly onto their own locations. The forward platoons of the 2 PPCLI were completely overrun by mass attacks of Chinese soldiers. The 2 PCCLI, with their ammunition and supplies exhausted, managed to  repel the attacks and the Chinese division withdrew with enormous casualties of over 3,000 Chinese soldiers killed and many more wounded during the assaults on Hill 677.  By contrast, the 2 PPCLI suffered 12 killed and 35 wounded. The Chinese leadership were not aware of how close to victory they had achieved against the Canadians, who were now without ammunition and supplies, and did not launch a final large-scale assault against the Canadian positions. The enemy division withdrew on 25 April well before Brigadier Burke sent any UN relief forces to Hill 677 on 26 April.

Second Battle of the Hook
Prince's wartime duty was taking a toll on his body, and his knees were subject to painful swelling and premature arthritis. He was hospitalized after a medical examination in May 1951. He was later returned to Canada, despite his vigorous protest, and assigned to administrative duties where he served as a platoon sergeant at The Officer Candidate School Canadian Forces Base Borden in Ontario. Here his knees improved, so in March 1952 he volunteered for a second tour of duty in the Far East. He sailed for Korea that October with the 3rd Battalion PPCLI.

Though the battalion was officially still training in November 1952, when Chinese forces attacked a vital sector on the Sami-chon River known as "the Hook" the 3rd PPCLI was called to assist British UN forces in the Second Battle of the Hook to recover the exposed forward position. The Patricia's had five members killed in the daylight counter-attack, but were able to recapture the post by November 19. Prince was among the nine wounded in the battalion with some shrapnel wounds to his legs, although he continued to fight until the outpost was retaken by Prince and his men. Prince refused evacuation for medical treatment, stating "I don't have time for that.", evidently unwilling to abandon his position at the outpost. He removed shrapnel from his legs with his bayonet by himself. Despite his wounds, he carried another wounded 3 PCCLI soldier on his back to the military medical station. Although he recovered from these wounds, he was hospitalized for several weeks in early 1953 for treatment on his knees. The armistice was signed during this period.

Following the Korean Armistice Agreement, he remained in the army, working as an instructor of new recruits in Winnipeg, Manitoba, until his honorable discharge on October 28, 1953. He continued to work at a personnel depot in Winnipeg until September 1954. He was granted a small military disability pension due to his injured knees.

Korean War Awards
Prince's  company commanding officers in Korea refused to nominate him for any individual award or medal for devising and leading the successful silent night assaults against Chinese forces in April 1951, or for leading his men in the recovery of the exposed UN forward position in the Second Battle of The Hook in November 1952.

In addition to the Presidential Unit Citation for the Battle of Kapyong, Prince and his fellow 2 PPCLI members were mentioned in the December 2016 designation of Lt. Col. Stone as an official Korean War Hero by the Government of South Korea Ministry of Patriots and Veterans Affairs. The citation of this award stated that the 2 PPCLI "achieved a milestone victory when they won the Battle of Gapyeong (Kapyong) against formidable attacks from Chinese troops" and that "with their victory in the Battle of Gapyeong (Kapyong), Stone and his soldiers are remembered as the Legends of Gapyeong to this day." Prince additionally received the Korea Medal (Canadian version) and the United Nations Korea Medal for his service. He was entitled, posthumously, to the Canadian Volunteer Service Medal for Korea after it was created in 1991.

Later Life

Access to Government Programs
Adjusting to civilian life was not easy for Prince after World War II and Korea, and with painfully arthritic knees as a result of the long, harsh conditions during his military service, his capabilities were limited. Although he had been granted a small military disability pension due to his knee injuries, as a First Nations member he was unable to access other programs. Prince was effectively denied access to the special Canadian armed forces WWII veteran benefits programs, which included WWII veterans employment programs, WWII veterans educational support, land purchase support for WWII military veterans, and supplementary income support programs for WWII veterans. The information and application forms for these programs were available only at local Royal Canadian Legion chapters. First Nations members were forbidden entrance to Royal Canadian Legion locations under the terms of the Indian Act, as alcohol was present on Legion premises. For this reason, Royal Canadian Legion chapters maintained their own bylaws forbidding the presence of First Nations members due to alcohol on the premises. These bylaws were formally removed nation-wide in 1966, some 20 years after the end of WWII. The requirement by the government to access special war veterans programs solely through Royal Canadian Legion premises, where First Nations veterans were forbidden entrance, appears to have been designed as a ruse to exclude First Nations from participation.

Reduced Circumstances
After his active military service ended in 1953, Prince married Verna Sinclair, with whom he had five children. At the same time, Prince found a permanent position at a Winnipeg ice cream factory. However, partly due to discrimination against Native people at the time, Prince occasionally encountered hostility from his co-workers who were not aware of his military achievements. Prince never used his military record to promote his interests in civilian life, even with his own family and friends. Although the ice cream plant owner supported him, Prince eventually left the position, unable to tolerate the personal barbs.  This occupational failure changed his personal outlook on society in general. 

In June 1955 Tommy Prince made the news for his heroism in saving a man from drowning in the Red River at the Alexander Docks in Winnipeg, using an army "stranglehold" to drag the struggling, resisting man to safety. Afterwards he quietly and humbly walked away before the media could descend on the scene. However, a bystander had recognized him and gave Prince's name to the police and also to the newspapers. In an interview resulting from this, Prince explained his decision to intervene, "I knew how I'd have felt if I were in the water unable to swim and someone just stood looking at me, not doing a thing."

His life became increasingly difficult, ultimately ending in his estrangement from his family due to financial problems. Prince and his wife separated in 1964 and his children were placed in foster homes. The movement of his children to different foster homes over short periods of time made it difficult for him to keep in touch with them, although his daughter Beryl remained in one foster home and he visited her every month.  Unlike other famous Canadian war heroes who also struggled in their civilian lives after the war ended, Prince was not assisted by well-off friends or offered positions by the government. His advocacy on behalf of First Nations and against the Indian Act had placed him as an opponent of prevailing government policies of the day. 

He spiraled into a depression, and like many war veterans, he experienced post battle stress symptoms and combat nightmares which caused him to awaken in a sweat and in terror. His personal life continued to deteriorate with alcoholism and homelessness. Winnipeg police officers knew him personally and also of his heroic war service, and would refuse to hold him for intoxication or vagrancy, instead providing transport to a Salvation Army facility.  His final years were spent virtually alone, living in a Salvation Army hostel room 6' by 8' and subsisting on temporary employment such as janitorial labour. Prince's son Tommy Prince Jr. and his girlfriend offered to accommodate his father at their own address, but Prince declined, not wanting to be a burden on his family.

Through courage and perseverance, Prince eventually overcame his alcoholism and would later give coherent media interviews and reminiscences of his military deeds. In order to support himself, he sold off his war medals. Despite his straitened finances, Prince remained generous to others and would give cash to people whom he judged to be worse off than himself.

Prince would attend the annual Remembrance Day reunions with his PPCLI comrades-in-arms. Claude Petit, a former fellow soldier from the Korean War, later stated that he was aware of Prince's struggles. Petit believed that "someone should have done something...especially the regiment...he spent his life in there, that's all he knew."

On one occasion at night in 1976 on the Winnipeg streets, Prince was assaulted and beaten by a street gang who were unaware of his identity. Later, in another incident, he was stabbed by a young man who had mistaken him for another First Nations man whom he had been targeting. These serious acts of violence  possibly contributed to Prince's demise the following year at the age of 62.

Provincial State Funeral
He died in 1977 at Winnipeg's Deer Lodge Centre, a health care facility specializing in geriatric care and treatment of veterans, and was interred in Brookside Cemetery, Winnipeg. Despite the reduced circumstances of his later years, he had retained his fame and he was given a  provincial state funeral, a notable event with significant official representatives and more than 500 people in attendance. At his state funeral service, a delegation from the Princess Patricia's Brigade served as his pallbearers. A group of men from the Saulteaux nation sang the "Death of a Warrior" song while his body was lowered into the grave. The PPCLI officer in charge of the military funeral service presented Prince's daughter Beverley Prince with the folded flag which had been draped over Tommy Prince's coffin. Official representatives included the Lieutenant-Governor of Manitoba on behalf of The Crown, senior officers of the Canadian Army, and the Consuls of France, of Italy and of the United States representing the respect for Prince of those nations. Prince's daughters Beryl and Beverley Prince were astonished at the impressive public response at the funeral of a man who had subsisted on menial jobs during his later years and they wondered where public officials had been during Prince's years of struggle with war wounds and unemployment. Prince had never discussed his war record with his daughters, and they were unaware of his status as a public hero before the funeral.

Honours and legacy
In 1976, one year before his death, Tommy Prince was awarded the Certificate of Merit by the Manitoba Indian Brotherhood (currently Assembly of Manitoba Chiefs) "for his years of dedicated service to the Indian people of Manitoba." Prince once stated later in his life, "All my life I had wanted to do something to help my people recover their good name."

Since his passing, a number of honours have been bestowed in his name. Some of them are:

 Sgt. Tommy Prince Street – Winnipeg, Manitoba
 Sgt. Tommy Prince School – Scanterbury, Manitoba
 The "Tommy Prince Barracks" at Canadian Forces Base, Petawawa, Ontario
 The "Tommy Prince Drill Hall" at the 3rd Canadian division Training Center in Wainwright, Alberta
 Government of Canada "Sergeant Tommy Prince Army Training Initiative" for aboriginal recruiting
 The "Tommy Prince Award": An Assembly of First Nations scholarship
 The "Tommy Prince Scholarship" at Sault College, Sault Ste. Marie, Ontario
 553 Sgt. Tommy Prince PPCLI Cadet Corps, Winnipeg, Manitoba
 Tommy Prince Road in the Valour Park/Victoria Cross Park – a mixed-use development of Currie Barracks in Calgary, Alberta (2010)
 Tom Prince Drive - Petersfield, Manitoba

In 1968, a major Hollywood film entitled "The Devil's Brigade" was produced, although Tommy Prince, the most decorated member of the Brigade, was not represented in the story line. Early in the film, an American soldier was featured in a soldier gambling scene, whose nickname was "Chief", perhaps a weak reference to Prince and his royal ancestry.

In 1998, the television documentary "Fallen Hero: The Tommy Prince Story" was aired and was nominated for three Leo Awards. 
The film is available on loan from the Canadian War Museum and from various university libraries. 

After Prince's death, his military medals changed hands several times before coming up for auction in 2000 in London, Ontario. His nephew, Jim Bear, organized a pledge drive and purchased the medals on August 10, 2000 for $75,000 on the third bid, an extraordinary bid level for military medals at the time. The bid was backed by pledges from Aboriginal groups, by the Royal Canadian Legion, and by the Canadian government Veterans Affairs Canada Minister Ron Duhamel, the latter two organizations now offering some form of support to the Prince family. The Prince war medals were verified as originals by the Canadian War Museum in Ottawa. Bear then entrusted them for permanent display purposes to the Manitoba Museum in Winnipeg, the medals remaining the property of the Prince family.

In 2002, the French Ambassador to Canada presented the Prince family with an official certificate from the Government of France acknowledging the bravery and contributions of Tommy Prince to the French people and to their freedom from German occupation during WWII.

In 2004, the Legislative Assembly of the Province of Manitoba unanimously passed a resolution honouring and recognizing Prince "for his contribution and sacrifice to both Canada and to the Province of Manitoba".

In 2005 Historica Canada released a Heritage Minute on Prince.

On 10 February 2010, it was announced that Canadian actor Adam Beach, who is (like Prince) a Manitoban of the Ojibwe and Salteaux nations, would portray the Canadian war hero in an upcoming movie about his life. Beach had previously portrayed Ira Hayes in the Clint Eastwood film Flags of Our Fathers. According to Bay Film Studios, the movie would be a "true account of Canada's most highly decorated First Nations soldier".  Beach, 37, said he was honoured to play Prince, calling him a positive role model for all First Nations. The Canadian Armed Forces agreed to participate in the production of the film. The film was later reported delayed by reshooting of scenes and the film studio in bankruptcy.

In 2013, the United States Congress passed a bill to award the 1st Special Service Force the Congressional Gold Medal.

In 2016, a play about Prince by playwright Alanis King, "Tommy Prince Story", was published and critically acclaimed.

In 2016, a plaque honouring Tommy Prince was installed in the main floor of the Legislative Building of the Province of Manitoba in Winnipeg, Manitoba.

In 2019, Tommy Prince was named one of the Persons of National Historic Significance of Canada, on the advice of the national Historic Sites & Monuments Board of Canada.

In November, 2019, a Bravery In Arms documentary was produced of the First Special Service Force assault on Monte Majo, in which Prince's unparalleled forward combat achievement had prepared the way for a strategically crucial action. In the documentary, Prince's accomplishment was described while showing the actual location of the battle.

In June 2020, a group of Conservative Party of Canada Members of Parliament started a petition and sent a letter to Finance Minister Bill Morneau and Governor of the Bank of Canada Tiff Macklem advocating for Prince's face to be displayed on the Canadian $5 bill.

On 17 October 2022 it was announced that Tommy Prince would be the subject of a postage stamp to be issued 28 October 2022, by Canada Post. The stamp shows Prince in his 2 PPCLI uniform from his Korean War period with a background of the Northern Lights (aurora borealis), his name with the designation MM (Military Medal), his decorations and mention of the Silver Star. The official presentation ceremony of the Tommy Prince postage stamp was attended and featured speeches by Prince's son Tommy Prince Jr. and by singer Willam Prince, a cousin of the family, who sang a song by Buffy Sainte Marie at the event.

References

Further reading
 Manitobans in Profile: Thomas George Prince, 1981, Penguin Publishers

External links
Prince, Tommy in the Canadian Encyclopedia
Tommy Prince, Canadian Hero, feature article at the Youth Encyclopedia of Canada
Heritage Minute video featuring Tommy Prince

1915 births
1977 deaths
20th-century First Nations people
Burials at Brookside Cemetery (Winnipeg)
Canadian Indigenous military personnel
Canadian Army personnel of World War II
Canadian military personnel of the Korean War
Recipients of the Silver Star
Canadian recipients of the Military Medal
People from Interlake Region, Manitoba
Saulteaux people
Royal Canadian Engineers soldiers
Princess Patricia's Canadian Light Infantry soldiers
Canadian military personnel from Manitoba
Foreign recipients of the Silver Star
1st Canadian Parachute Battalion